Liolaemus sitesi is a species of lizard in the family Liolaemidae. It is native to Argentina.

References

sitesi
Reptiles described in 2013
Taxa named by Luciano Javier Ávila
Taxa named by Mariana Morando
Reptiles of Argentina
Endemic fauna of Argentina